Colorado's 20th Senate district is one of 35 districts in the Colorado Senate. It has been represented by Democrat Lisa Cutter since 2023. Prior to redistricting the district was represented by Democrat Jessie Danielson and independent Cheri Jahn.

Geography
District 20 covers the immediate western suburbs of Denver in Jefferson County, including Applewood, Wheat Ridge, and parts of Arvada and Lakewood.

The district is largely based in Colorado's 7th congressional district, with small pieces extending into the 1st and 2nd congressional districts. It overlaps with the 22nd, 23rd, 24th, 25th, 27th, and 28th districts of the Colorado House of Representatives.

Recent election results
Colorado state senators are elected to staggered four-year terms; under normal circumstances, the 20th district holds elections in midterm years. The 2022 election will be the first held under the state's new district lines.

2022
Thanks to redistricting, Senator Rachel Zenzinger is running for re-election in the 22nd district in 2022, and State Rep. Lisa Cutter is running for the 20th district in her stead.

Historical election results

2018

2014

Federal and statewide results in District 20

References 

20
Jefferson County, Colorado